Stenomacra marginella is a species of bordered plant bug in the family Largidae. It is found in Central America, North America, and South America.

References

Further reading

 
 
 

Largidae
Insects described in 1850